The International Association for Lichenology (IAL) is an organisation that encourages the understanding of lichens and lichenology, and promotes their study and conservation worldwide. It unites lichenologists across the globe, as well as national and regional organisations into one group. It is affiliated to the International Union of Biological Sciences (IUBS). The IAL organises field courses and excursions, as well as symposia which are the biggest events in lichenology on the international level. The 8th International Symposium will be held in Helsinki, Finland, in August 2016.

The IAL publishes a biennial journal, the International Lichenological Newsletter which was the raison d'etre for the IAL being formed in 1967 in order to provide a forum for lichenologists worldwide to communicate with one other. Nowadays the IAL also operates an online discussion forum for lichenologists known as 'lichens-L'.

History
The International Lichenological Association arose out of the 10th International Botanical Congress, held in Edinburgh in 1964, when a small group of lichenologists approved a motion to form an international association. The intention was to produce a newsletter to disseminate information quickly amongst lichenologists around the world, and a small committee comprising Rolf Santesson, Peter James and Vernon Ahmadjian was appointed to get it established.
The association's official inauguration took place at the 11th International Botanical Congress in Seattle in 1969 when the General Assembly of the IUBS officially recognised the new organisation.

Awards
The IAL currently hands out four awards to recognise significant contributions made to lichenology.

The Acharius Medal is awarded to distinguished lichenologists in recognition of their lifetime achievements. Recipients have included David Hawksworth (2002), Nina Golubkova (2000), Vernon Ahmadjian (1996), Irwin Brodo (1994), William Culberson (1992), Aino Henssen (1992), Hildur Krog (1992) and Hans Trass (1992).
 
The Mason Hale Award is granted in recognition of excellence in research by young lichenologists, such as doctoral dissertations.

The Margalith Galun Award is presented for outstanding student contributions to an IAL meeting.

The Sylvia Sharnoff Education Award is given to an outstanding web page devoted to lichens.

Symposia
The IAL organises major symposia every four years.

The First International Lichenological Symposium, IAL1, was held at the University of Münster, Germany, 16–21 March 1986.  Title: Progress and problems in lichenology in the eighties.
The Second International Lichenological Symposium, IAL2, was held in Båstad, Sweden, 30 August – 4 September 1992. Title: Progress and problems in Lichenology in the nineties.
The Third International Lichenological Symposium, IAL3, was held at the University of Salzburg, Austria, 1–7 September 1996. Title: Progress and Problems in Lichenology in the Nineties
The Fourth International Lichenological Symposium, IAL4, was held in Barcelona, Spain, 3–8 September 2000. It was organised with the University of Barcelona. Title: Progress and Problems in Lichenology at the Turn of the Millennium
The Fifth International Lichenological Symposium, IAL5, was held in Tartu, Estonia 16–21 August 2004 and was organised by the University of Tartu. Title: Lichens in focus.
The Sixth International Lichenological Symposium, IAL6, was held in Monterey, California, July 13–19 July 2008 as a joint meeting with the American Bryological and Lichenological Society Title: Lichens In The New World
The Seventh International Lichenological Symposium, IAL7, was held in Bangkok, Thailand, 9–13 January 2012, jointly organised with Ramkhamhaeng University. Symposium Title: Lichens: from genome to ecosystems in a changing world.
The Eighth International Lichenological Symposium, IAL8, was held in Helsinki, Finland in August 2016, jointly organised with the  Finnish Museum of Natural History. Title: Lichens in deep time.
The Ninth International Lichenological Symposium, IAL9, was held online, in August 2021. Title: Unlocking the inner lichen.

References

External links
Website of the International Association for Lichenology

International scientific organizations
Biology organizations